Sarujeh-ye Olya (also Romanized as Sārūjeh-ye ‘Olyā) is a village in Mahmudabad Rural District, in the Central District of Shahin Dezh County, West Azerbaijan Province, Iran. At the 2006 census, its population was 571, in 101 families.

References 

Populated places in Shahin Dezh County